The 1981 Women's W.I.S.R.F World Team Squash Championships were held in Canada and took place from October 25 until November 2, 1981.

Results

Group 1

Group 2

Positional Play Offs

Final

References

See also 
World Team Squash Championships
World Squash Federation
World Open (squash)

Squash tournaments in Canada
International sports competitions hosted by Canada
Squash
Wom
World Squash Championships
1981 in women's squash